The M-1978 Koksan is a 170 mm self-propelled gun of North Korean design and manufacture. Very little information is available due to the secretive nature of the North Korean government. The designations M-1978 and Koksan were given to the type by US military analysts, as they first became aware of it in that year in Koksan, North Korea.

What is known is that it is a 170 mm (6.69 in) self-propelled gun of the open turret type. It was first seen publicly during a military parade in 1985. At least one example has been acquired by the United States.

Development
According to Jane's, the Koksan is based on a Chinese Type 59 tank chassis. The 170 mm gun is in an open mount with no superstructure, and is stabilized when firing by two large folding spades at the rear. The mount is not connected directly to the chassis; it is connected to four rails that allow the gun to slide back when recoiling. The gun has a range that would allow it to strike Seoul from the Korean Demilitarized Zone.

170 mm is not a standard Russian or subsequently Soviet caliber, however the German armed forces during World War II did use 17 cm caliber cannons, indicating that this weapon may have been designed to use Soviet-supplied stocks of captured German wartime ammunition. Other sources point to a 17 cm Kanone 18 barrel being joined with the base of a 180 mm gun S-23.

The M-1978 version carried no on-board ammunition supply. In 1989, a new version of the Koksan appeared, that was designated the M-1989. The main difference was a lengthened chassis that allows 12 rounds of ammunition to be carried. This version also removed the rail recoil system, permanently fixing the mount at the rear but features two recoil cylinders above the gun, instead of one. It carries a crew of four; the remaining four personnel needed to man the gun ride in an accompanying ammunition and support vehicle.

Unlike its predecessor, the M-1989 has occasionally been put on public display by the North Koreans during parades and news broadcasts. One example has also been seen on display at International Defence Exhibition and Conference 2005 in the United Arab Emirates.

Deployment

Little is publicly known about how North Korea organizes and deploys its artillery. It has been suggested that M-1978's and M-1989's equipped battalions consist of 12 guns, 20-30 trucks and 150-190 personnel, organized into a battalion headquarters and three batteries with four guns per battery. Battalions are organized into a brigade consisting of 3 to 6 battalions. The brigade has a brigade headquarters and supporting engineer, air-defense and target acquisition units.

In 1987, several M-1978s were supplied to Iran, and used during the Iran–Iraq War. When using rocket-assisted projectiles, a range of almost  could be achieved, making the weapon the world's longest-ranged field artillery piece at the time. Iranian forces used them to carry out long-range harassment fire against Kuwaiti oil fields.

A number of the Iranian guns were subsequently captured by the Iraqis and placed on public display. At least one of these was recovered by US Marines in 2008 from the campus of the University of Anbar.

Al Anbar University

A Koksan artillery piece was towed to University of Anbar around the 29 May 2003. At this time, soldiers from the United States 2/5 Field Artillery Battalion had been occupying the grounds of the university. The self-propelled weapon was towed to the university grounds so that it may be returned with the unit as a trophy. The idea to bring the weapon back to the United States was eventually abandoned. It was at this time that soldiers from the 2/5 Battalion disabled the gun with a thermite device. Eventually, the 2/5 Battalion was reassigned to a new area of operations and the cannon was left at the university.

Operators

Current operators
  - M1978 variant
 
Former operators

See also

 2S7 Pion, a similar Soviet heavy self-propelled artillery piece
 M110 howitzer, heavy SPG formerly used by the United States

References

External links

Tracked self-propelled howitzers
170 mm artillery
Self-propelled artillery of Iran
Self-propelled artillery of North Korea
Military vehicles introduced in the 1970s